The 2008–2009 MOL Liga Season was the first season played, of this international ice hockey. Six teams from Hungary and two from Romania participated.

Teams

 Alba Volán Székesfehérvár II
 Budapest Stars
 Dunaújvárosi Acélbikák
 Ferencvárosi TC
 HC Csíkszereda
 Progym Hargita Gyöngye
 Miskolci JJSE
 SC Miercurea Ciuc
 Steaua București
 Újpesti TE

Standings

Final Standings

Play-offs

Semifinals
HC Csíkszereda 2–0 Budapest Stars
SC Miercurea Ciuc 2–0 Újpesti TE

Finals
HC Csíkszereda 3–0 SC Miercurea Ciuc

References

2008–09 in European ice hockey leagues
Erste Liga (ice hockey) seasons